State Route 182 (SR 182) is a primary state highway in the U.S. state of Virginia. The state highway runs  from U.S. Route 13 (US 13) in Painter east to SR 605 at Quinby in southern Accomack County.

Route description

SR 182 begins at an intersection with US 13 (Lankford Highway) in the town of Painter. The state highway follows two-lane undivided Main Street very briefly east of US 13, during which the highway intersects an inactive railroad line. East of the inactive rail line, SR 182 turns north onto Railroad Avenue, then veers east onto Edmunds Street. The state highway leaves town along Mappsburg Road, which the highway follows to the hamlet of Mappsburg. SR 182 continues east as Quinby Bridge Road, which crosses the Machipongo River on the namesake bridge. The state highway reaches its eastern terminus at SR 605, which heads north as Bradfords Neck Road and south as Upshur Neck Road through the village of Quinby on Upshur Bay.

Major intersections

References

External links

Virginia Highways Project: VA 182

182
State Route 182